Uladzimir Shcherba (born 1 April 1986) is a Belarusian footballer. He currently plays for Dinamo Brest.

Honours
Dinamo Brest
Belarusian Cup winner: 2006–07

Torpedo-BelAZ Zhodino
Belarusian Cup winner: 2015–16

External links
 
 
 Player profile on official site

1986 births
Living people
Belarusian footballers
Association football defenders
Belarusian expatriate footballers
Expatriate footballers in Russia
FC Dinamo Minsk players
FC Dinamo-Juni Minsk players
FC Dynamo Brest players
FC Orenburg players
FC Dnepr Mogilev players
FC Torpedo-BelAZ Zhodino players